Mark Rodgers (born 2001) is an Irish hurler who plays for Clare Senior Championship club Scariff and at inter-county level with the Clare senior hurling team.

Career

Rodgers first came to hurling prominence at juvenile and underage levels with Scraiff before eventually joining the club's top adult team.  He won a Clare IHC title in 2020 after Scariff beat Tubber in the final. Rodgers first appeared on the inter-county scene as a member of the Clare minor hurling team in 2018. He later spent two seasons with the Clare under-20 hurling team before being drafted onto the Clare senior hurling team in 2021. Rodgers went on to have success in 3rd Level, winning two Fitzgibbon Cups and was joint captain on the last Fitzgibbon.

Career statistics

Honours

University of Limerick
Fitzgibbon Cup: 2022
Fitzgibbon Cup: 2023

Scariff
Clare Intermediate Hurling Championship: 2020

References

2001 births
Living people
Scariff hurlers
Clare inter-county hurlers